Marcelo dos Santos (born 17 March 1979) mostly known as Marcelo Cabrita is a Brazilian football forward, who currently plays for Esporte Clube Santo André.

He played for Jaruense, C.D. Platense and F.C. Motagua in the Honduran Liga Nacional.

References

1979 births
Living people
Brazilian footballers
Brazilian expatriate footballers
Platense F.C. players
F.C. Motagua players
Liga Nacional de Fútbol Profesional de Honduras players
Expatriate footballers in Honduras
Esporte Clube Santo André players
People from Ji-Paraná
Association football forwards
Sportspeople from Rondônia